Mothership is a single-movement composition for orchestra and electronica by the American composer Mason Bates.  The piece received its world premiere March 20, 2011 at the Sydney Opera House by the YouTube Symphony Orchestra under Michael Tilson Thomas, with featured improvisatorial soloists Paulo Calligopoulos on electric guitar, Ali Bello on violin, Su Chang on zheng, and John Burgess on bass guitar.  The premiere was broadcast live on YouTube and garnered nearly two million viewers.

Composition
Bates discussed the composition in the score program notes, writing, "This energetic opener imagines the orchestra as a mothership that is ‘docked’ by several visiting soloists, who offer brief but virtuosic riffs on the work's thematic material over action-packed electro-acoustic orchestral figuration."  He continued:

Instrumentation
The original orchestral arrangement of Mothership is scored for three flutes (3rd doubling piccolo), E-flat clarinet, two clarinets (both doubling bass clarinet), three oboes (3rd doubling English horn), two bassoons, contrabassoon, four French horns, three trumpets, two trombones, bass trombone, tuba, three percussionists, laptop, timpani, harp, piano, and strings.

A subsequent wind ensemble arrangement of the piece by Bates is scored for four flutes (1st and 2nd doubling piccolo), two oboes (2nd doubling English horn), two bassoons, contrabassoon, E-flat clarinet, four clarinets, two bass clarinets, soprano saxophone, alto saxophone, tenor saxophone, baritone saxophone, four C trumpets, four French horns, two trombones, bass trombone, euphonium, tuba, harp, piano, four percussionists, launch pad, timpani, and double bass.

Reception
Andrew Druckenbrod of the Pittsburgh Post-Gazette conceded that the piece is likely not Bates's best work, but that "it showcases the orchestra's ability to be inclusive." Druckenbrod added, "Mothership is fun, and there is nothing wrong with that!"

References

External links

Compositions by Mason Bates
2011 compositions
Compositions for symphony orchestra
Concert band pieces
21st-century classical music
YouTube